The Independent Party Current was an electoral alliance of Egyptian political parties that will compete in the 2013 Egyptian parliamentary election.

It consisted of two parties: the Arab Democratic Nasserist Party and the Democratic Peace Party.

References

2012 establishments in Egypt
Defunct political party alliances in Egypt